Bhaskar Gupta (born 21 October 1942) is an Indian former cricketer. He played one first-class match for Bengal in 1964/65.

See also
 List of Bengal cricketers

References

External links
 

1942 births
Living people
Indian cricketers
Bengal cricketers
Cricketers from Dhaka